Kilai may refer to:
 Kilai County, former name of Hualien County, Taiwan Province, Taiwan
 Kilai City, former name of Hualien City, a port city and the seat of Hualien County

See also 
 Killai, town in Tamil Nadu, India
 Kiai, a short shout uttered when performing an attacking move in Japanese martial arts